Allium rosenorum is a species of wild onion native to Tajikistan and Uzbekistan. Its 'Michael H. Hoog' cultivar has gained the Royal Horticultural Society's Award of Garden Merit as an ornamental, and is also considered by them as a good plant to attract pollinators.

References

rosenorum
Plants described in 1994